Two-time defending champion Roger Federer defeated Andy Roddick in a rematch of the previous year's final, 6–2, 7–6(7–2), 6–4 to win the gentlemen's singles tennis title at the 2005 Wimbledon Championships. It was Federer's third Wimbledon title and fifth major title overall. It was the second of three years that Federer defeated Roddick in the final (following 2004 and preceding 2009).

This tournament was the first major tournament in which future world No. 1 and two-time Wimbledon champion Andy Murray competed in the main draw; and the first Wimbledon for future world No. 1 and seven-time Wimbledon champion Novak Djokovic. Both players were defeated in the third round: Djokovic lost to Sébastien Grosjean in four sets, while Murray lost to David Nalbandian after leading two sets to love; to date it remains the only professional match in which Murray has lost from two sets up. By reaching the third round, Djokovic entered the top 100 in the ATP rankings for the first time in his career.

Seeds

  Roger Federer (champion)
  Andy Roddick (final)
  Lleyton Hewitt (semifinals)
  Rafael Nadal (second round)
  Marat Safin (third round)
  Tim Henman (second round)
  Guillermo Cañas (withdrew)
  Nikolay Davydenko (second round)
  Sébastien Grosjean (quarterfinals)
  Mario Ančić (fourth round)
  Joachim Johansson (third round)
  Thomas Johansson (semifinals)
  Tommy Robredo (first round)
  Radek Štěpánek (second round)
  Guillermo Coria (fourth round)
  Mariano Puerta (first round)
  David Ferrer (first round)
  David Nalbandian (quarterfinals)
  Tommy Haas (first round)
  Ivan Ljubičić (first round)
  Fernando González (quarterfinals)
  Dominik Hrbatý (second round)
  Juan Carlos Ferrero (fourth round)
  Taylor Dent (fourth round)
  Nicolas Kiefer (third round)
  Feliciano López (quarterfinals)
  Richard Gasquet (fourth round)
  Jiří Novák (third round)
  Nicolás Massú (second round)
  Robin Söderling (first round)
  Mikhail Youzhny (fourth round)
  Filippo Volandri (first round)
  Olivier Rochus (second round)

Guillermo Cañas withdrew due to injury. He was replaced in the draw by the highest-ranked non-seeded player Olivier Rochus, who became the #33 seed.

Qualifying

Draw

Finals

Top half

Section 1

Section 2

Section 3

Section 4

Bottom half

Section 5

Section 6

Section 7

Section 8

References

External links

 2005 Wimbledon Championships – Men's draws and results at the International Tennis Federation

Men's Singles
Wimbledon Championship by year – Men's singles